Yopno (Yupna, after the Yupna Valley) is one of the Finisterre languages of Papua New Guinea. Dialects are Kewieng, Nokopo, Wandabong, Isan. Yupno speakers orient themselves using local topography.

Phonology

References

Further reading
 

Finisterre languages
Languages of Madang Province
Languages of Morobe Province